The list of shipwrecks in July 1886 includes ships sunk, foundered, grounded, or otherwise lost during July 1886.

1 July

3 July

4 July

5 July

6 July

7 July

8 July

9 July

14 July

16 July

18 July

19 July

20 July

21 July

22 July

30 July

31 July

Unknown date

References

1886-07
Maritime incidents in July 1886